Amanda Coetzer was the defending champion, but lost in quarterfinals to Paola Suárez.

Katarina Srebotnik won the title by defeating Paola Suárez 6–7(1–7), 6–4, 6–2 in the final.

Seeds
The first two seeds received a bye into the second round.

Draw

Finals

Top half

Bottom half

Qualifying

Seeds

Qualifiers

Qualifying draw

First qualifier

Second qualifier

Third qualifier

Fourth qualifier

References
 ITF tournament profile

2002 Abierto Mexicano Pegaso
Abierto Mexicano Pegaso